"Return of the Mack" is a song written and recorded by British R&B singer Mark Morrison, released as the third single from his debut album by the same name (1996). It topped the UK Singles Chart a month after its release, then became a European and Australian hit. In the United States, it reached number two on the Billboard Hot 100 and went platinum. The accompanying music video, directed by Jake Nava, was released in the United Kingdom in March 1996 and in the United States in February 1997.

Background and composition
The song's beat is sampled from the song "Genius of Love" by American band Tom Tom Club. "Games" by Chuckii Booker was also sampled, as well as fragments from "UFO" by ESG, Cerrone's "Rocket in the Pocket", and "Feel The Heartbeat" by The Treacherous Three.

Critical reception
Larry Flick from Billboard felt that UK crooner Mark Morrison "energizes a deflated U.S. R&B scene" with the song, noting that he "shows international promise with fresh lyrics and vocals, and classic soul production reminiscent of R&B's '80s heyday." Matt Diehl from Entertainment Weekly remarked that Morrison "comes off more like a funked-up Seal, promising revenge to a deceitful lover in a warbly croon. The end result is an odd but infectious new-jack-swing variation on "Hey Joe", buoyed by bubbly beats and the insistent title refrain." Another editor, Leah Greenblatt described the track as a "new-jackalicious breakup jam". Tom Ewing of Freaky Trigger noted that "the music certainly has his back – the rubbery basslines cocooning the song, the satisfying crunch of the drums, the light keyboard touches helping Morrison glide along his comeback trail." He added that it "is a pleasure to listen to, a well-tailored suit of sound." 

Caroline Sullivan from The Guardian concluded in her album review, "He plays the sunglasses-at-night role to perfection on the album's title (and best) track".<ref>Sullivan, Caroline (April 26, 1996). "Music: This week's Pop CD releases. The Guardian.</ref> A reviewer from Music Week rated it four out of five, adding that the singer "looks to maintain the momentum of his hit Crazy with another assured mix of R&B and ragga." Ralph Tee from the magazine's RM Dance Update gave it five out of five, writing, "This simply is every bit as good as what you would get from an American r&b act on a major label — and the song's better than most of what's coming out from across the pond of late." He added further, "The urban street production is a perfect vehicle for Mark's Jamaica-style tinged soul vocal on a song that deserves to be a smash, or an anthem at the very least." 

Chart performance
"Return of the Mack" was very successful on the charts on several continents, peaking at number-one on both the RPM Dance/Urban chart in Canada and the Billboard Rhythmic chart in the United States. In Europe, it hit number-one in the United Kingdom in its sixth week at the UK Singles Chart, on 14 April 1996. The single spent two weeks at the top position. It made it into the top 10 also in Austria, Belgium, Denmark, Germany, Ireland (number two), the Netherlands, Norway, Scotland, Sweden (number two) and Switzerland, as well as on the Eurochart Hot 100. Outside Europe, "Return of the Mack" also reached number-one in Zimbabwe, number two in Australia and on the Billboard Hot 100. In New Zealand, it peaked at number three, while peaking at number 17 on the RPM Top Singles chart in Canada. The single earned a gold record in France and Germany, and a platinum record in Australia, New Zealand and the US. In the UK, it was awarded with a 2× platinum record.

Music video
The accompanying music video for "Return of the Mack" was directed by British director Jake Nava. It begins with Morrison arriving in London by plane in the evening. In his car (A silver Mercedes-Benz SL-Class) towards the city, he starts singing. He has flashbacks of himself and his girlfriend, now ex. The car then stops in front of his ex and her new boyfriend standing by the street. The singer sings as he watches the new couple. Later he arrives at an underground club and hands the DJ a record which is immediately played. Shortly afterwards, the ex shows up in the club with her new guy. Standing in the crowd of dancing people, Morrison sings towards his ex. Then he sits down at a desk, inside an office. The ex comes in and sits down. They are confronting each other, and she ends up getting up, letting the chair fall as she leaves, looking at Morrison with a regretful face. The video ends with a close-up of Morrison sitting in the office in thoughts, while he smiles to the camera.

The cheating girlfriend is played by then unknown model Suzannah Agrippa miming to a featured vocal performance by Angie Brown. Numerous other extras were friends of the director.

Impact and legacy
In 2007, Stylus Magazine ranked it number 40 on its list of the "Top 50 One-Hit Wonders", stating that "over plush keyboards, fake turntable scratches, and a rhythm track that will be around 'til time immemorial, Morrison relates his griefs with an ex who he’s returned to—what? Gloat in her face? Point out he’s still surviving, even thriving? Nope, he’s really returned to show what sleek R&B grooves and odd vocal cadences he’s developed since being dumped." 

In 2012, Porcys listed "Return of the Mack" at number 71 in their ranking of "100 Singles 1990-1999".

In 2017, BuzzFeed listed it at number 48 in their list of "The 101 Greatest Dance Songs of the '90s".

In 2019, Billboard placed it at number 102 in their ranking of "Billboards Top Songs of the '90s".

Formats and track listings

 CD maxi and 12-inch maxi – US
 "Return of the Mack" (C&J X-Tended Radio Edit/US Album Version) – 7:20
 "Return of the Mack" (Da Beatminerz Remix) - 4:32
 "Return of the Mack" (Accappella of the Mack) - 2:56
 "Trippin'" (C&J Street Mix) – 4:19
 "Trippin'" (Salaam Remi Mix) – 4:22
 "Return of the Mack" (Instrumental) – 5:49

 CD single – US
 "Return of the Mack" (C&J Edit) - 3:32
 "Return of the Mack" (Da Beatminerz Remix) - 4:32

 CD single – Europe
 "Return of the Mack" (C&J Radio Edit) – 3:32
 "Return of the Mack" (Joe T. Vannelli Light Radio Edit) – 3:57
 "Return of the Mack" (C&J Street Mix/UK Album Version) – 4:34
 "Return of the Mack" (Terence Dackombe Mind Tricks Mix) – 3:46
 "Return of the Mack" (D-Influence Mix) – 4:29
 "Return of the Mack" (Full Crew Mix) – 3:56
 "Return of the Mack" (Sir Gant Mix) – 4:58

 12-inch maxi – Europe
 "Return of the Mack" (C&J Street Mix/UK Album Version) – 4:34
 "Return of the Mack" (D-Influence Mix) – 4:29
 "Return of the Mack" (Joe T. Vannelli Light Mix) – 7:30
 "Return of the Mack" (Joe T. Vannelli X-tended Corvette Mix) – 6:44

Charts

Weekly charts

Year-end charts

Decade-end charts

All-time charts

Certifications

Release history

Mann version

American hip-hop/rap artist Mann released a cover version of the song, featuring vocals from Snoop Dogg and Iyaz. His version is simply titled "The Mack". The single was released in the United Kingdom on 23 May 2011 as a digital download. The Music Video premiered on Mann's YouTube Channel on 28 June. It was released in the United States on 5 July 2011.

Music video
A music video to accompany the release of "The Mack" was first released onto YouTube on 23 June 2011 at a total length of three minutes and fifty-five seconds. It features Mann, Iyaz and Snoop Dogg, at a pool party that starts off in the day into the night and they are surrounded by women. Mark is also shown entering London Heathrow Airport and then driving a car.

Track listing

Charts

Release history

Nevada version

Swedish-American DJ Nevada sampled the original version of "Return of the Mack" and retitled the release "The Mack", 20 years after the release of the original version. Nevada's version features the original vocals of Mark Morrison and Angie Brown, and additional vocals from American rapper Fetty Wap. The song was written by Morrison, William Maxwell, Pyramids in Paris, and Jonathan White. It was released to digital download through Straightforward Music, Nourishing Music, and Capitol Records on 23 September 2016. 

Charts

Weekly charts

Year-end charts

Certifications

Release history

In popular culture
The song has been used in numerous movies and TV shows like Entourage, It's Always Sunny in Philadelphia and My Mad Fat Diary.

The song was used in the soundtrack for the Volition 2011 action-adventure video game Saints Row: The Third on the in-game radio station The Mix 107.77.

A season 3 episode of Legends of Tomorrow is called "Return of the Mack" and features a fight taking place while the song is playing in the background.

In 2016, it was featured heavily in a Season 5 episode of New Girl, "A Chill Day In."

In 2017, Burger King used the song in a commercial for their menu item Mac 'n' Cheetos.

In 2020, McDonald's New Zealand also used the song in a commercial advertising the return of the Big Mac and other products after its stores were closed for four weeks due to the COVID-19 pandemic. Similarly, McDonald's in the UK used the song in a commercial advertising their branches reopening after having been shut for nearly four months in light of the COVID-19 pandemic.

In 2021, Donnie Wahlberg sang this song on the fifth season of The Masked Singer as "Cluedle-Doo".

On February 5, 2021, American rapper G-Eazy sampled the song over and named it Provide. It features American singer Chris Brown and Morrison himself from Eazy's fourth studio album These Things Happen Too.

Morrison appears in a Frito-Lay Variety Pack commercial with his song changing the lyrics.

Use in politics 
The song figured as the campaign anthem of 2020 Democratic Party presidential candidate Andrew Yang during his presidential campaign, and was played at most of his rallies and speeches.

References

 Christopher G. Feldman, The Billboard Book of Number 2 Singles'', .

External links
 Official YouTube music video
 Official YouTube video of Mann version of song

1996 singles
1996 songs
1997 singles
2011 singles
2016 debut singles
Fetty Wap songs
Iyaz songs
Mark Morrison songs
Music videos directed by Jake Nava
New jack swing songs
Number-one singles in Zimbabwe
Snoop Dogg songs
Song recordings produced by Cutfather & Joe
Songs about infidelity
Songs written by Mark Morrison
Tropical house songs
UK Singles Chart number-one singles